Ketteringham is a village and civil parish located in the English county of Norfolk.
For the purposes of local government, it falls within the district of South Norfolk.

Notes

External links

https://www.literarynorfolk.co.uk/ketteringham.htm

South Norfolk
Villages in Norfolk
Civil parishes in Norfolk